Rumen Sandev (born 19 November 1988) is a Bulgarian footballer currently playing as a defender for Marek Dupnitsa.

References

External links
 

1988 births
Living people
Bulgarian footballers
First Professional Football League (Bulgaria) players
Association football defenders
OFC Pirin Blagoevgrad players
FC Arda Kardzhali players
FC Septemvri Sofia players
FC Strumska Slava Radomir players
Sportspeople from Blagoevgrad